Gettin' Old is the upcoming fourth studio album by American country music singer Luke Combs, scheduled to be released on March 24, 2023, through Columbia Records Nashville and River House Records. It follows less than a year after his third album Growin' Up (2022)—both albums were recorded together and are intended as companion albums. The album includes the promotional singles "Growin' Up and Gettin' Old" and "Love You Anyway". Combs will embark on a world tour the day after the album's release.

Content
Combs recorded Growin' Up and Gettin' Old together, but decided to release them as two separate albums. The title of the first promotional single, "Growin' Up and Gettin' Old" combines the two, and the two cover artworks can also be placed side by side. Combs co-wrote 15 of the 18 tracks, and the album also includes a cover of Tracy Chapman's "Fast Car". Like its companion album, Combs co-produced with Chip Matthews and Jonathan Singleton. Combs stated that the album "is about the stage of life I'm in right now. One that I'm sure a lot of us are in, have been through, or will go through", as well as "coming of age", "loving where life is now but at the same time missing how it used to be" and "living in the moment but still wondering how much time you have left".

Combs revealed the track listing in early February 2023.

Track listing

References

2022 albums
Albums produced by Jonathan Singleton
Albums produced by Luke Combs
Columbia Records albums
Luke Combs albums